The America the Beautiful silver bullion coins comprise a series of silver bullion coins with a face value of a quarter dollar. The coins contain five troy ounces of silver, making them the largest silver bullion coins ever issued by the United States Mint. The design of the coins duplicates exactly—though enlarged—each of the America the Beautiful quarters. They were issued from 2010 to 2021. The coins were available for sale during the year in which their corresponding circulating coin is issued. The coins are distributed by the United States Mint's network of authorized bullion dealers, and may be resold at the discretion of the Director of the National Park Service.

Design

All coins in the series feature a common obverse depicting George Washington in a restored version of the portrait created by John Flanagan for the 1932 Washington quarter, while the reverse feature five individual designs for each year of the program (one in 2021), each depicting a national park or national site (one from each state, federal district, and territory). Unlike the reeded edge of the normal quarter, the silver coins have a smooth edge inscribed with the coin specifications: .999 FINE SILVER 5.0 OUNCE.

Differences between uncirculated and bullion versions
There are three main differences between the uncirculated and bullion versions of the coin:

Each uncirculated coin comes with a certificate of authenticity from the Mint and is placed inside a plastic capsule and then in a presentation box; the bullion version is shipped in tubes of 10 coins. The tubes are shipped by the mint in "monster boxes", ten tubes to a box, and the contents are sold at the retailer's discretion.
The uncirculated coins are vapor blasted after minting, giving them a matte finish, while bullion coins have a shinier finish.
Under the "In God We Trust" inscription, the uncirculated coins feature a "P" mint mark representing the Philadelphia mint, whereas the bullion coins do not have a mint mark.

Legislative history

The program is authorized by Title II of the America’s Beautiful National Parks Quarter Dollar Coin Act of 2008.

Minting history
A new coining press from Germany was installed on March 1, 2010, at the Philadelphia Mint for use in producing the America the Beautiful Silver Bullion Coins. Silver planchets for the series will be supplied by Sunshine Minting.

In conjunction with the April 27, 2010, meeting of the Citizens Coinage Advisory Committee in Philadelphia, committee members were shown examples of the America the Beautiful silver bullion coins.

Coins released to date

See also

America the Beautiful quarters
America the Beautiful quarter mintage figures
American Silver Eagle
Bullion
Bullion coin
Inflation hedge
Silver as an investment

Notes

External links
United States Mint America the Beautiful Quarters Program

Currencies introduced in 2010
United States silver coins
Bison on coins
George Washington on United States currency
Bullion coins of the United States
Silver bullion coins